(Praise be to You, Jesus Christ), 91, is a church cantata by Johann Sebastian Bach. He wrote the Christmas cantata in Leipzig in 1724 for Christmas Day and first performed it on 25 December 1724. The chorale cantata is based on the hymn "" (1524) by Martin Luther.

History and words 
The chorale cantata from Bach's second annual cycle is based on the main chorale for Christmas Day, "" (1524) by Martin Luther. The beginning summarizes Christmas in two lines: "" (Praise be to You, Jesus Christ, since You were born a man). All stanzas end with the acclamation . The cantata was Bach's first composed for Christmas Day in Leipzig; in his first year in Leipzig 1723 he had chosen to perform again , written before in Weimar.

The prescribed readings for the feast day were from the Epistle to Titus, "God's mercy appeared" or from Isaiah, "Unto us a child is born", and from the Gospel of Luke, the Nativity, Annunciation to the shepherds and the angels' song. The unknown poet of the cantata text kept the first and the last stanza, expanded verse 2 by recitatives, transformed stanzas 3 and 4 to movement 3, an aria, stanza 5 to a recitative, and stanza 6 again to an aria.

Bach performed the cantata again four more times on 25 December, in 1731, in 1732 or 1733, and twice in the 1740s, even after his Christmas Oratorio had been first performed in 1734, which also uses two stanzas of Luther's chorale.

Scoring and structure 
The cantata in six movements is festively scored for soprano, alto, tenor, and bass, a four-part choir, two horns, timpani, three oboes, two violins, viola and basso continuo. He would later use the pair of horns in Part IV of his Christmas Oratorio.

 Chorale: 
 Recitative (and chorale, soprano): 
 Aria (tenor): 
 Recitative (bass): 
 Aria (soprano, alto): 
 Chorale:

Music 
The opening chorus makes use of four choirs: the voices, the horns, the oboes and the strings. The material from the ritornellos is present also in interludes between the five lines and as accompaniment for the vocal parts. The choral melody is sung by the soprano. The lower voices are set in imitation for the first and the last line, in chords for the second and fourth line, and in a combination in the central line "" (from a virgin, this is true).

In movement 2, the recitative is contrasted with chorale phrases, which are accompanied by a repetition of the first line of the chorale in double tempo. The tenor aria is accompanied by three oboes, whereas the strings illuminate the following recitative. The last aria is a duet, contrasting "" (poverty) and "" (abundance), "" (human being), rendered in chromatic upward lines, and "" (angelic splendours), shown in coloraturas and triadic melodies.

At times the horns have independent parts in the closing chorale and embellish especially the final .

Recordings 
 J. S. Bach: Das Kantatenwerk – Sacred Cantatas Vol. 5, Gustav Leonhardt, Knabenchor Hannover, Collegium Vocale Gent, Leonhardt-Consort, Detlef Bratschke (soloist of the Knabenchor Hannover), Paul Esswood, Kurt Equiluz, Max van Egmond, Teldec 1979
 J. S. Bach: Complete Cantatas Vol. 12, Ton Koopman, Amsterdam Baroque Orchestra & Choir, Lisa Larsson, Annette Markert, Christoph Prégardien, Klaus Mertens, Antoine Marchand 2000
 Bach Cantatas Vol. 14: New York, John Eliot Gardiner, Monteverdi Choir, English Baroque Soloists, Katharine Fuge, Robin Tyson, James Gilchrist, Peter Harvey, Soli Deo Gloria 2000
 J. S. Bach: Christmas Cantatas from Leipzig, Philippe Herreweghe, Collegium Vocale Gent, Dorothee Mields, Ingeborg Danz, Mark Padmore, Peter Kooy, Harmonia Mundi Franc 2001
 J. S. Bach: Cantatas Vol. 31, conductor Masaaki Suzuki, Bach Collegium Japan, Yukari Nonoshita, Robin Blaze, Gerd Türk, Peter Kooy, BIS 2004

References

Sources 
 
 Gelobet seist du, Jesu Christ BWV 91; BC A 9b / Chorale cantata  (1st Christmas Day) Leipzig University
 Cantata BWV 91 Gelobet seist du, Jesu Christ history, scoring, sources for text and music, translations to various languages, discography, discussion, Bach Cantatas Website
 BWV 91 Gelobet seist du, Jesu Christ English translation, University of Vermont
 BWV 91 Gelobet seist du, Jesu Christ text, scoring, University of Alberta
 Luke Dahn: BWV 91.6 bach-chorales.com

Church cantatas by Johann Sebastian Bach
1724 compositions
Christmas cantatas
Chorale cantatas